Yusufeli (Berdagrak; , Akhalti) is a town and district of Artvin Province in the Black Sea region of Turkey. It is located on the bank of Çoruh River 104 km south-west of the city of Artvin, on the road to Erzurum. It is the seat of Yusufeli District. Its population is 7,306 (2021).

The town of Yusufeli sits in a valley where the Çoruh River is joined by the Barhal. To its north are the Kaçkar Mountains running east to west, with villages in other valleys between the mountains. The micro climate allows the cultivation of olives, grapes, and citrus fruits, the driving forces of the economy in addition to tourism.

There is a widely criticised plan to dam the Çoruh at Yusufeli, which would submerge 15,000 homes.

Climate 
Yusufeli has an oceanic climate (Köppen: Cfb).

History 

The history of Yusufeli, formerly Perterek or Pertarek, is traced to 3000 BC, the Bronze Age. The area has since been inhabited by Hurri, Urartu, Persians, Armenians, Ancient Romans, Byzantines and Georgians. In the Turkish era the area has been settled by Seljuks, Saltuks, Ilkhanates, Tamerlan, Akkoyunlu, Safevids and the Ottoman Empire. In the kingdom of Armenia in antiquity it was part of Tayk province, known as the Canton of Arsiats por.
In 1879 the area was the district of Kiksim in the county of Çıldır. Then following the war between the Ottoman Empire and Russia it became a county of Erzurum. Most of the population is descended from Armenians or Georgians who converted to Islam in the 1700s.

Because of the rocky geography it was difficult for people from all villages to reach the city center, so a local district was established centred on Ögdem, but this was still inaccessible so Kılıçkaya (Ersis) became the center of county. Ersis means "a place where no boys live", so-called because so many sons of the district were lost in the Russo-Turkish War of 1878 and First World War. In the year 1912 the county name became Yusuf İli, i.e. "province of Yusuf" so the name Kiskim should not be confused with the name Keskin which was a county of Ankara at that time.

Culture 
The folk music and culture is typical of the Black Sea region featuring the clarinet type zurna, a drum and bagpipes.

There are a number of historical Georgian churches in the valleys of Yusufeli, including the ruins of the Four Churches (Dört Kilise) in a village off the road to İspir (Map).

Places of interest 
There are many medieval forts and Georgian churches in the valleys of Yusufeli. Some of them:
 Armashen fortress
 Ersis fortress
 Nihak fortres
 Oshnak fortress
 Ishan monastery
 Ogdem fortress
 Peterek fortress
 Parhal monastery
 Savangin, a pre-historical cave with an inscription written in an undeciphered writing system

Notable natives 
 The singer and politician Zülfü Livaneli was born into a family from Yusufeli.
 The former mayor of Istanbul, Kadir Topbaş, was born in Yusufeli.

References

External links 
 Yusufeli-video
 The Municipality
 Local information website with a photo gallery

Populated places in Artvin Province
Towns in Turkey
Yusufeli District